The Eau Claire River is a river in the U.S. state of Wisconsin.  It is a tributary of the Wisconsin River.  The Eau Claire River originates in western Langlade County and flows into Marathon County.

The Eau Claire River flows through "Dells of the Eau Claire" then to Wausau before it converges into the Wisconsin River just north of Schofield.

External links

Rivers of Wisconsin
Rivers of Langlade County, Wisconsin
Rivers of Marathon County, Wisconsin